Tess Coady  (born 2 November 2000) is an Australian snowboarder who competes internationally, along with being a bronze medallist in the slopestyle event at the 2022 Winter Olympics.

Career
Coady participated at the FIS Freestyle Ski and Snowboarding World Championships 2017 in Sierra Nevada, Spain, where she competed in big air and in slopestyle.
 
She represented Australia at the 2018 Winter Olympics. At 17 years old, Coady was the youngest athlete on Australia's Olympic team in PyeongChang. She was set to make her Olympic debut in the slopestyle event, but tore her ACL while undertaking a practice run in difficult conditions. The qualification heats for the slopestyle event were later cancelled due to strong winds.

Since 2020, Coady has been affiliated with the artistic collective Drain Gang.

On 6 February 2022, she won the bronze medal in the slopestyle event at the 2022 Winter Olympics.

References

External links

2000 births
Living people
Australian female snowboarders
Sportspeople from Melbourne
Snowboarders at the 2018 Winter Olympics
Snowboarders at the 2022 Winter Olympics
Medalists at the 2022 Winter Olympics
Olympic snowboarders of Australia
Olympic bronze medalists for Australia
21st-century Australian women
Sportswomen from Victoria (Australia)
X Games athletes